Alexander Alexandrovich Gutsalyuk (born ) is a Russian male volleyball player. With his club Zenit Kazan he competed at the 2011 FIVB Volleyball Men's Club World Championship.

Sporting achievements

Clubs

CEV Champions League
  2011/2012 - with Zenit Kazan
  2012/2013 - with Lokomotiv Novosibirsk
  2014/2015 - with Zenit Kazan
  2015/2016 - with Zenit Kazan
  2016/2017 - with Zenit Kazan

FIVB Club World Championship
  2011 Qatar - with Zenit Kazan
  2015 Brazil - with Zenit Kazan
  2016 Brazil - with Zenit Kazan
  2017 Poland - with Zenit Kazan

National championships
 2011/2012  Russian SuperCup 2011, with Zenit Kazan
 2011/2012  Russian Championship, with Zenit Kazan
 2013/2014  Russian Cup, with Zenit Kazan
 2014/2015  Russian Cup, with Zenit Kazan
 2014/2015  Russian Championship, with Zenit Kazan
 2015/2016  Russian SuperCup 2015, with Zenit Kazan
 2015/2016  Russian Cup, with Zenit Kazan
 2015/2016  Russian Championship, with Zenit Kazan
 2016/2017  Russian SuperCup 2016, with Zenit Kazan
 2016/2017  Russian Cup, with Zenit Kazan
 2016/2017  Russian Championship, with Zenit Kazan
 2017/2018  Russian SuperCup 2017, with Zenit Kazan

References

External links
 profile at FIVB.org

1988 births
Living people
Russian men's volleyball players
Place of birth missing (living people)
Universiade medalists in volleyball
Universiade gold medalists for Russia
Medalists at the 2011 Summer Universiade
20th-century Russian people
21st-century Russian people